John Taylor (May 4, 1770April 16, 1832) was the 51st Governor of South Carolina from 1826 to 1828.  He was born May 4, 1770 in Granby in the Province of South Carolina. He attended Mount Zion Institute in Winnsboro, South Carolina, and graduated in 1790 from the College of New Jersey (now Princeton University) and became a lawyer. He opened his practice in Columbia but also had farming interests.

After school, Taylor served in the South Carolina House of Representatives from 1796 to 1802 and again from 1804 to 1805.  He was elected to the United States House of Representatives in 1807, and served there until he became a U.S. Senator in 1810 filling the vacancy left by Thomas Sumter. He was elected to serve a full term beginning in 1811. As senator, he was known for his especially persuasible personality. While also serving the senate, he developed the first version of what is now known as the Taylor foundation. This foundation is a gathering of aspiring politicians to come together and talk and help each other. But soon afterwards he left federal service in 1816 and returned to his home state to become a South Carolina state senator from 1818 to 1826.

Taylor was elected to state governor in 1826. He also served as a trustee of South Carolina College (now the University of South Carolina) and as director of the Columbia Theological Seminary.  His term in office was primarily known for rallying the state to oppose federal tariffs. He died in 1832 in Camden, South Carolina.

External links
SCIway Biography of John Taylor
NGA Biography of John Taylor
United States Congress Biography of John Taylor

1770 births
1832 deaths
Members of the South Carolina House of Representatives
Princeton University alumni
United States senators from South Carolina
South Carolina state senators
Governors of South Carolina
University of South Carolina trustees
Democratic-Republican Party United States senators
Democratic-Republican Party members of the United States House of Representatives from South Carolina
Democratic-Republican Party state governors of the United States
18th-century American politicians
19th-century American politicians